1948 was the 49th season of County Championship cricket in England. Don Bradman, who was shortly to retire, made his final appearance in England. Bradman's Australian team, which included Arthur Morris, a very young Neil Harvey, Ray Lindwall and Keith Miller, went through the tour without being beaten and became known to cricket's folklore as "The Invincibles". They won the Test series 4–0. Glamorgan won the County Championship for the first time under the dynamic captaincy of Wilf Wooller.

The season was preceded by the first publication of Playfair Cricket Annual which has become a mainstay among cricket publications. Playfair is a pocket guide (though in its early years it had a larger page size) providing a mass of potted information about the sport, and is seen by many fans as an essential accessory to watching cricket in England.

Honours
County Championship – Glamorgan
Minor Counties Championship – Lancashire II
Wisden (Wisden Cricketers of the Year 1949 for their deeds in the 1948 season) – Lindsay Hassett, Bill Johnston, Ray Lindwall, Arthur Morris, Don Tallon

County Championship

Test series

Australia's "Invincibles" defeated England 4–0 with the Third Test drawn. England's batting was strong on paper, the first four in the order generally being Len Hutton, Cyril Washbrook, Bill Edrich and Denis Compton. But they found the fast bowling trio of Lindwall, Miller and Johnston a handful, especially since the playing conditions that summer allowed a new ball to be taken after only 55 overs. England's bowling was largely reliant on Alec Bedser, and against such a strong Australian batting line-up even his average was unimpressive.

The first innings of the First Test set the pattern, with England only reaching as many as 165 thanks to 63 from Jim Laker at number 9. Johnston finished with 5/36. In reply, Bradman and Hassett both made centuries, and England had a deficit of 344. Assisted by an injury that prevented Lindwall from bowling, England made 441 in their second innings, thanks mainly to 184 by Compton, but Australia still won by 8 wickets.

Australia won at Lord's by 409 runs, with Morris making a century in the first innings and Sid Barnes one in the second, and none of the English side even reaching fifty in either innings. Lindwall took 5/70 in the first innings and Ernie Toshack had 5/40 in the second.

The Third Test was drawn, and England might have won had not the Manchester weather caused much time to be lost. In England's first innings Compton had to retire hurt early on after being hit on the head by Lindwall, and needed two stitches, but he returned to the crease at 119 for 5 and finished with 145 not out out of 363.

At Headingley, one of the most famous of all Tests was played. It was a high-scoring affair, with Washbrook and Edrich making hundreds in England's first innings, and Harvey - on his debut in Anglo-Australian Tests - making one for Australia. Early on the final day, with the pitch by now helping spin, England declared their second innings, setting Australia to make 404 in 344 minutes. Laker, not yet the force that he would be a few years later, bowled poorly, and there were many fielding lapses. Thus, against all expectation, Australia got the runs with 12 minutes and 7 wickets to spare, with Morris making 182 and Bradman 173 not out.

The final Test of the series was the biggest disaster of all for England. They lost by an innings and 149 runs. Batting first, England were shot out for 52, of which Hutton made 30. Lindwall took 6/20. The Australian openers put on 117, and the total eventually reached 389 (Morris 196). In their second effort England managed only 188. (Johnston 4/40). It was known that this would be Bradman's final Test, and the crowd gave him an ovation when he walked out to bat. He only needed four runs to average 100 in Test cricket, but Eric Hollies bowled him second ball for a duck.

Morris finished the series with 696 runs at 87.00, and Lindwall and Johnston each took 27 wickets. For England, the player emerging with most credit was Compton, with 562 runs at 62.44.

Leading batsmen

Leading bowlers

References

Annual reviews
 Playfair Cricket Annual 1949
 Wisden Cricketers' Almanack 1949

Further reading
 Bill Frindall, The Wisden Book of Test Cricket 1877-1978, Wisden, 1979
 Chris Harte, A History of Australian Cricket, Andre Deutsch, 1993
 Ray Robinson, On Top Down Under, Cassell, 1975

External links
 CricketArchive – season summary

1948 in English cricket
English cricket seasons in the 20th century
The Invincibles (cricket)
Welsh cricket in the 20th century